SOCKS is an Internet protocol that exchanges network packets between a client and server through a proxy server. SOCKS5 optionally provides authentication so only authorized users may access a server. Practically, a SOCKS server proxies TCP connections to an arbitrary IP address, and provides a means for UDP packets to be forwarded.

SOCKS performs at Layer 5 of the OSI model (the session layer, an intermediate layer between the presentation layer and the transport layer).

History

The protocol was originally developed/designed by David Koblas, a system administrator of MIPS Computer Systems. After MIPS was taken over by Silicon Graphics in 1992, Koblas presented a paper on SOCKS at that year's Usenix Security Symposium, making SOCKS publicly available. The protocol was extended to version 4 by Ying-Da Lee of NEC.

The SOCKS reference architecture and client are owned by Permeo Technologies, a spin-off from NEC. (Blue Coat Systems bought out Permeo Technologies, and were in turn acquired by Symantec.)

The SOCKS5 protocol was originally a security protocol that made firewalls and other security products easier to administer. The protocol was developed in collaboration with Aventail Corporation, which markets the technology outside of Asia.

Usage
SOCKS is a de facto standard for circuit-level gateways (level 5 gateways).

The circuit/session level nature of SOCKS make it a versatile tool in forwarding any TCP (or UDP since SOCKS5) traffic, creating an interface for all types of routing tools. It can be used as:

 A circumvention tool, allowing traffic to bypass Internet filtering to access content otherwise blocked, e.g., by governments, workplaces, schools, and country-specific web services. Since SOCKS is very detectable, a common approach is to present a SOCKS interface for more sophisticated protocols:
 The Tor onion proxy software presents a SOCKS interface to its clients.
 Providing similar functionality to a virtual private network, allowing connections to be forwarded to a server's "local" network:
 Some SSH suites, such as OpenSSH, support dynamic port forwarding that allows the user to create a local SOCKS proxy. This can free the user from the limitations of connecting only to a predefined remote port and server.

Protocol

SOCKS4

A typical SOCKS4 connection request looks like this:

VER SOCKS version number, 0x04 for this version
CMD command code:
0x01 = establish a TCP/IP stream connection
0x02 = establish a TCP/IP port binding
DSTPORT2-byte port number (in network byte order)
DESTIP IPv4 Address, 4 bytes (in network byte order)
ID the user ID string, variable length, null-terminated.

VN reply version, null byte
REP reply code
{| class="wikitable"
!Byte
!Meaning
|-
|0x5A
|Request granted
|-
|0x5B
|Request rejected or failed
|-
|0x5C
|Request failed because client is not running identd (or not reachable from server)
|-
|0x5D
|Request failed because client's identd could not confirm the user ID in the request
|}
DSTPORT destination port, meaningful if granted in BIND, otherwise ignore
DSTIP destination IP, as above – the ip:port the client should bind to

For example, this a SOCKS4 request to connect Fred to 66.102.7.99:80, the server replies with an "OK":

Client: 0x04 | 0x01 | 0x00 0x50 | 0x42 0x66 0x07 0x63 | 0x46 0x72 0x65 0x64 0x00
The last field is "Fred" in ASCII, followed by a null byte.
Server: 0x00 | 0x5A | 0xXX 0xXX | 0xXX 0xXX 0xXX 0xXX
0xXX can be any byte value. The SOCKS4 protocol specifies that the values of these bytes should be ignored.

From this point onwards, any data sent from the SOCKS client to the SOCKS server is relayed to 66.102.7.99, and vice versa.

The command field may be 0x01 for "connect" or 0x02 for "bind"; the "bind" command allows incoming connections for protocols such as active FTP.

SOCKS4a

SOCKS4a extends the SOCKS4 protocol to allow a client to specify a destination domain name rather than an IP address; this is useful when the client itself cannot resolve the destination host's domain name to an IP address. It was proposed by Ying-Da Lee, the author of SOCKS4.

The client should set the first three bytes of DSTIP to NULL and the last byte to a non-zero value. (This corresponds to IP address 0.0.0.x, with x nonzero, an inadmissible destination address and thus should never occur if the client can resolve the domain name.) Following the NULL byte terminating USERID, the client must send the destination domain name and terminate it with another NULL byte. This is used for both "connect" and "bind" requests.

Client to SOCKS server:

SOCKS4_C SOCKS4 client handshake packet (above)
DOMAIN the domain name of the host to contact , null (0x00) terminated

Server to SOCKS client: (Same as SOCKS4)

A server using protocol SOCKS4a must check the DSTIP in the request packet. If it represents address 0.0.0.x with nonzero x, the server must read in the domain name that the client sends in the packet. The server should resolve the domain name and make connection to the destination host if it can.

SOCKS5

It is an incompatible extension of the SOCKS4 protocol; it offers more choices for authentication and adds support for IPv6 and UDP, the latter of which can be used for DNS lookups. The initial handshake consists of the following:
Client connects and sends a greeting, which includes a list of authentication methods supported.
Server chooses one of the methods (or sends a failure response if none of them are acceptable).
Several messages may now pass between the client and the server, depending on the authentication method chosen.
Client sends a connection request similar to SOCKS4.
Server responds similar to SOCKS4.

The initial greeting from the client is:

 VER SOCKS version (0x05)
 NAUTH Number of authentication methods supported, uint8
 AUTH Authentication methods, 1 byte per method supported
The authentication methods supported are numbered as follows:
0x00: No authentication
0x01: GSSAPI
0x02: Username/password
0x03–0x7F: methods assigned by IANA
0x03: Challenge-Handshake Authentication Protocol
0x04: Unassigned
0x05: Challenge-Response Authentication Method
0x06: Secure Sockets Layer
0x07: NDS Authentication
0x08: Multi-Authentication Framework
0x09: JSON Parameter Block
0x0A–0x7F: Unassigned
0x80–0xFE: methods reserved for private use

 VER SOCKS version (0x05)
 CAUTH chosen authentication method, or 0xFF if no acceptable methods were offered

The subsequent authentication is method-dependent. Username and password authentication (method 0x02) is described in :

 VER 0x01 for current version of username/password authentication
 IDLEN, ID Username length, uint8; username as bytestring
 PWLEN, PW Password length, uint8; password as bytestring

 VER 0x01 for current version of username/password authentication
 STATUS 0x00 success, otherwise failure, connection must be closed

After authentication the connection can proceed. We first define an address datatype as:

 TYPE type of the address. One of:
0x01: IPv4 address
0x03: Domain name
0x04: IPv6 address
 ADDR the address data that follows. Depending on type:
4 bytes for IPv4 address
1 byte of name length followed by 1–255 bytes for the domain name
16 bytes for IPv6 address

 VER SOCKS version (0x05)
 CMD command code:
0x01: establish a TCP/IP stream connection
0x02: establish a TCP/IP port binding
0x03: associate a UDP port
 RSV reserved, must be 0x00
 DSTADDR destination address, see the address structure above.
 DSTPORT port number in a network byte order

 VER SOCKS version (0x05)
 STATUS status code:
0x00: request granted
0x01: general failure
0x02: connection not allowed by ruleset
0x03: network unreachable
0x04: host unreachable
0x05: connection refused by destination host
0x06: TTL expired
0x07: command not supported / protocol error
0x08: address type not supported
 RSV reserved, must be 0x00
 BNDADDR server bound address (defined in ) in the "SOCKS5 address" format specified above
 BNDPORT server bound port number in a network byte order

Since clients are allowed to use either resolved addresses or domain names, a convention from cURL exists to label the domain name variant of SOCKS5 "socks5h", and the other simply "socks5". A similar convention exists between SOCKS4a and SOCKS4.

Software

Servers

SOCKS proxy server implementations
 Sun Java System Web Proxy Server is a caching proxy server running on Solaris, Linux and Windows servers that support HTTPS, NSAPI I/O filters, dynamic reconfiguration, SOCKSv5 and reverse proxy.
 WinGate is a multi-protocol proxy server and SOCKS server for Microsoft Windows which supports SOCKS4, SOCKS4a and SOCKS5 (including UDP-ASSOCIATE and GSSAPI auth).  It also supports handing over SOCKS connections to the HTTP proxy, so can cache and scan HTTP over SOCKS.
 Socksgate5 SocksGate5 is an application-SOCKS firewall with inspection feature on Layer 7 of the OSI model, the Application Layer. Because packets are inspected at 7 OSI Level the application-SOCKS firewall may search for protocol non-compliance and blocking specified content.
 Dante is a circuit-level SOCKS server that can be used to provide convenient and secure network connectivity, requiring only the host Dante runs on to have external network connectivity.

Other programs providing SOCKS server interface
 OpenSSH allows dynamic creation of tunnels, specified via a subset of the SOCKS protocol, supporting the CONNECT command.
 PuTTY is a Win32 SSH client that supports local creation of SOCKS (dynamic) tunnels through remote SSH servers.
 Secure ShellFish is a SSH client for iOS and macOS that includes a SOCKS server.
 ShimmerCat is a web server that uses SOCKS5 to simulate an internal network, allowing web developers to test their local sites without modifying their /etc/hosts file. 
 Tor is a system intended to enable online anonymity. Tor offers a TCP-only SOCKS server interface to its clients.
 Shadowsocks is a circumvent censorship tool. It provides a SOCKS5 interface.
 netcat implementations, as Ncat and socat.

Clients

Client software must have native SOCKS support in order to connect through SOCKS. There are programs that allow users to circumvent such limitations:

Socksifiers
Socksifiers allow applications to access the networks to use a proxy without needing to support any proxy protocols. The most common way is to set up a virtual network adapter and appropriate routing tables to send traffic through the adapter.
Win2Socks, which enables applications to access the network through SOCKS5, HTTPS or Shadowsocks.
tun2socks, an open source tool that creates virtual TCP TUN adapters from a SOCKS proxy, capable of UDP if supported on another end. Works on Linux and Windows, has a macOS port and reimplementation in Golang.
proxychains, a Unix program that forces TCP traffic through SOCKS or HTTP proxies on (dynamically-linked) programs it launches. Works on various Unix-like systems.

Translating proxies
 Polipo, a forwarding and caching HTTP/1.1 proxy server with IPv4 support. Open Source running on Linux, OpenWrt, Windows, Mac OS X, and FreeBSD. Almost any Web browser can use it.
 Privoxy, a non-caching SOCKS-to-HTTP proxy.
 Tinyproxy, a light-weight HTTP/HTTPS proxy daemon for POSIX operating systems. Designed from the ground up to be fast and yet small. It presents an http proxy interface and can connect to SOCKS4/5 and http upstream proxies.

Security 

Due to lack of request and packets exchange encryption it makes SOCKS practically vulnerable to man-in-the-middle attacks and IP addresses eavesdropping which in consequence clears a way to censorship by governments.

References

External links
 : SOCKS Protocol Version 5
 : Username/Password Authentication for SOCKS V5
 : GSS-API Authentication Method for SOCKS Version 5
 : A SOCKS-based IPv6/IPv4 Gateway Mechanism
 Draft-ietf-aft-socks-chap, Challenge-Handshake Authentication Protocol for SOCKS V5
 SOCKS: A protocol for TCP proxy across firewalls,  SOCKS Protocol Version 4 (NEC)

Internet protocols
Internet privacy software
Session layer protocols